The 2016 Connecticut Open (also known as the 2016 Connecticut Open presented by United Technologies for sponsorship reasons) was a women's tennis tournament played on outdoor hard courts. It was the 48th edition of the Connecticut Open, and part of the Premier Series of the 2016 WTA Tour. It took place at the Cullman-Heyman Tennis Center in New Haven, Connecticut, United States, from August 21 through August 27. It was the last event of the 2016 US Open Series before the 2016 US Open.

Points and prize money

Point distribution

Prize money

Singles main-draw entrants

Seeds

 Rankings are as of 15 August 2016

Other entrants
The following players received wildcards into the singles main draw: 
  Eugenie Bouchard
  Agnieszka Radwańska 
  Shelby Rogers
  Caroline Wozniacki

The following players received entry from the qualifying draw:
  Annika Beck
  Louisa Chirico
  Nicole Gibbs
  Ana Konjuh
  Maria Sakkari
  Anastasija Sevastova

The following players received entry as lucky losers:
  Kayla Day
  Kirsten Flipkens
  Camila Giorgi
  Anett Kontaveit
  Johanna Larsson
  Evgeniya Rodina

Withdrawals
Before the tournament
  Jelena Janković → replaced by  Kristina Mladenovic
  Madison Keys → replaced by  Camila Giorgi
  Johanna Konta → replaced by  Anett Kontaveit
  Svetlana Kuznetsova → replaced by  Johanna Larsson
  Anastasia Pavlyuchenkova → replaced by  Kayla Day
  Karolína Plíšková → replaced by  Kirsten Flipkens
  Sloane Stephens → replaced by  Caroline Garcia
  Barbora Strýcová → replaced by  Evgeniya Rodina

Retirements
  Anett Kontaveit

Doubles main-draw entrants

Seeds

Rankings are as of 15 August 2016

Other entrants
The following pair received wildcards into the doubles main draw:
  Louisa Chirico /  Alison Riske
  Hsieh Su-wei /  Andrea Petkovic
  Klaudia Jans-Ignacik /  Caroline Wozniacki

Finals

Singles

  Agnieszka Radwańska defeated  Elina Svitolina, 6–1, 7–6(7–3)

Doubles

  Sania Mirza /  Monica Niculescu defeated  Kateryna Bondarenko /  Chuang Chia-jung, 7–5, 6–4

Notes

References

External links

 
Connecticut Open by year
2016 WTA Tour
2016 US Open Series
August 2016 sports events in the United States